James Phelan (born 1951) is an American writer, literary scholar, and Distinguished University Professor of English at The Ohio State University. He joined the faculty of Ohio State in 1977 after earning his MA and PhD from the University of Chicago. At the University of Chicago, he studied with the Chicago School theorists Sheldon Sacks and Wayne Booth. In 2013 he was awarded an honorary doctorate from Aarhus University (Denmark), and in 2016 he was inducted into the Norwegian Academy of Science and Letters. In 2020 the International Society for the Study of Narrative named him the winner of the 2021 Wayne C. Booth Lifetime Achievement Award. The citation for the Award reads in part,"Phelan has influenced generations of narrative theorists and literary scholars, as he has provided a powerful model for thinking about the purposes of literature and reasons and methods to engage with it.  In so doing, he has transformed and energized the interdisciplinary field of narrative studies." The recording of the Award ceremony from the May 2021 ISSN Conference can be found at the Society's website. 

The editor of Narrative (the journal of the International Society for the Study of Narrative), Phelan has written numerous books and articles on narrative theory that together offer a detailed elaboration of what it means to conceive of narrative as rhetoric. He encapsulates that conception in his default definition of narrative as "somebody telling somebody else on some occasion and for some purpose(s) that something happened." Phelan's books include Worlds from Words (1981), Reading People, Reading Plots (1989), Narrative as Rhetoric (1996), Living to Tell about It (2005), Experiencing Fiction: Judgments, Progressions, and the Rhetorical Theory of Narrative (2007),"Reading the American Novel, 1920-2010" (2013) and Somebody Telling Somebody Else: A Rhetorical Poetics of Narrative (2017). He has collaborated with David Herman, Peter J. Rabinowitz, Brian Richardson, and Robyn Warhol on Narrative Theory: Core Concepts and Critical Debates (2012). In 2020 he collaborated with Matthew Clark on Debating Rhetorical Narratology: On the Synthetic, Mimetic, and Thematic Aspects of Narrative.  In this book Clark responds to Phelan's previously published ideas about these aspects, especially in Reading People, Reading Plots, and then Phelan replies to Clark.  In 2018, the journal Style devoted a special double issue to his work: Phelan wrote a "target essay" (based on the theoretical argument of Somebody Telling Somebody Else), twenty-five others wrote short responses, and then Phelan replied to those responses.  Phelan has also edited or co-edited several collections including the Blackwell Companion to Narrative Theory (2005, co-edited with Peter J. Rabinowitz) and Teaching Narrative Theory (2010, co-edited with David Herman and Brian McHale). With Peter J. Rabinowitz, Phelan co-edited the Ohio State University Press book series, The Theory and Interpretation of Narrative from 1993-2019.  He now continues as co-editor with Katra Byram and Faey Halpern.  Born in Flushing, NY, Phelan graduated in 1972 with a BA in English from Boston College. At BC he played on the basketball team, earning Academic All-American honors in 1972.

In 1991 he wrote a memoir called Beyond the Tenure Track: Fifteen Months in the Life of an English Professor. Along with Frederick Aldama, Brian McHale, and David Herman, he founded Project Narrative, an initiative at Ohio State University.

References

Bibliography
 Debating Rhetorical Narratology: On the Synthetic, Mimetic, and Thematic Aspects of Narrative(with Matthew Clark). Ohio State University Press, 2020.
 Somebody Telling Somebody Else: Toward a Rhetorical Poetics of Narrative. Columbus:Ohio State University Press, 2017.
 Reading the American Novel, 1920-2010. Malden: Wiley-Blackwell, 2013.
 Narrative Theory: Core Concepts and Critical Debates. Co-authored with David Herman, Peter J. Rabinowitz, Brian Richardson, and Robyn Warhol. Columbus: Ohio State University Press, 2012.
 After Testimony: The Ethics and Aesthetics of Holocaust Narrative for the Future. Co-edited with Susan Suleiman and Jakob Lothe. Columbus: Ohio State University Press, 2012.
 Fact, Fiction, and Form: Selected Essays of Ralph W. Rader. Columbus: Ohio State University Press, 2011.
 Teaching Narrative Theory. Co-edited with David Herman and Brian McHale. New York: MLA Publications, 2010.
 Joseph Conrad: Voice, Sequence, History, Genre. Co-edited with Jakob Lothe and Jeremy Hawthorn. Columbus: Ohio State University Press, 2008.
 Experiencing Fiction: Judgments, Progressions, and the Rhetorical Theory of Narrative. Columbus: Ohio State University Press, 2007.
 The Nature of Narrative. With Robert Scholes and Robert Kellogg. 2nd  Edition.  New York: Oxford University Press, 2006.*
 A Companion to Narrative Theory. Co-edited with Peter J. Rabinowitz.  Malden: Blackwell, 2005.
 Living To Tell About It: A Rhetoric and Ethics of Character Narration. Ithaca: Cornell University Press, 2005.
 The Tempest:  A Case Study in Critical Controversy. Co-edited with Gerald Graff. Boston: Bedford/St. Martin's, 2000.
 Narrative as Rhetoric: Technique, Audiences, Ethics, Ideology. Columbus: Ohio State University Press, 1996.
 Adventures of Huckleberry Finn: A Case Study in Critical Controversy. Co-edited with Gerald Graff. Boston: Bedford Books, 1995.
 Understanding Narrative. Co-edited with Peter J. Rabinowitz. Columbus: Ohio State University Press, 1994.
 Beyond the Tenure Track: Fifteen Months in the Life of an English Professor. Columbus: Ohio State University Press, 1991.
 Reading People, Reading Plots: Character, Progression, and the Interpretation of Narrative. Chicago: University of Chicago Press, 1989.
 Reading Narrative: Form, Ethics, Ideology. Editor. Columbus: Ohio State University Press, 1989.
 Worlds from Words: A Theory of Language in Fiction. Chicago: University of Chicago Press, 1981.

1951 births
American academics of English literature
University of Chicago alumni
Ohio State University faculty
Living people
Place of birth missing (living people)
Members of the Norwegian Academy of Science and Letters